Tomas Alexander Asuncion Tizon (October 30, 1959 – March 23, 2017) was a Filipino-American author and Pulitzer Prize-winning journalist. His book Big Little Man, a memoir and cultural history, explores themes related to race, masculinity, and personal identity. Tizon taught at the University of Oregon School of Journalism and Communication. His final story, titled "My Family's Slave", was published as the cover story of the June 2017 issue of The Atlantic after his death, sparking significant debate.

Biography 
Tizon was born Tomas Alexander Asuncion Tizon in Manila, Philippines on October 30, 1959, the second of five children. He immigrated with his family in 1964, shortly before the first big wave of Asian immigration to the United States in the postwar era. His childhood was marked by financial hardship and frequent long-distance moves. Through twelve grades, he attended eight schools from Honolulu to New York City. He earned degrees from the University of Oregon and Stanford University. In 1997, Tizon won the Pulitzer Prize for Investigative Reporting. Towards the end of his life, he wrote a piece in The Atlantic about Eudocia Tomas Pulido, a Filipina peasant woman who was his family's slave. Pulido helped to raise Tizon's mother, all of her children and Tizon's daughters.

Work 
As a reporter for The Seattle Times, he and two colleagues won the 1997 Pulitzer Prize for Investigative Reporting for a five-part series about fraud and mismanagement in the Federal Indian Housing Program.

After the 9/11 terrorist attacks, Tizon and photographer Alan Berner drove from Seattle to Ground Zero in New York City, chronicling their journey with a multi-part series called "Crossing America – Dispatches From a New Nation," which explored the changes brought about by the attacks. In 2002, he and Berner made another trip to Ground Zero, this time taking a southern route, and produced the series, "Crossing America – One Year Later."

Tizon was Seattle Bureau Chief for the Los Angeles Times from 2003 to 2008. He was a Knight International Journalism Fellow based in Manila in 2009 and 2010.

Big Little Man 
He expanded upon his journalistic themes—exiles, immigrants, social outcasts, people searching for identity or purpose—in a personal way in his book Big Little Man: In Search of My Asian Self. Tizon told his own story as a first-generation immigrant and an Asian male growing up in the United States to examine cultural mythologies related to race and gender, in particular the Western stereotypes of Asian men and women. The book won the 2011 J. Anthony Lukas Book Prize Work-In-Progress Award, sponsored by Columbia University and the Nieman Foundation at Harvard.

Death 
Tizon was found dead in his home in Eugene, Oregon, on March 23, 2017. He was 57. His death appeared to be the result of natural causes.

The last story Tizon wrote was an article for The Atlantic titled "My Family's Slave" in which he described how his parents had kept a peasant woman named Eudocia Tomas Pulido as a household slave, even after emigrating to the U.S. from the Philippines. He died the day that The Atlantics editorial staff decided the article would be featured on the magazine's front cover, but before they could tell him of their decision.

References 

1959 births
2017 deaths
20th-century American journalists
20th-century Filipino writers
21st-century American journalists
21st-century Filipino writers
American male journalists
American writers of Filipino descent
Filipino emigrants to the United States
Los Angeles Times people
Pulitzer Prize for Investigative Reporting winners
Stanford University alumni
University of Oregon alumni
University of Oregon faculty
Writers from Eugene, Oregon
Writers from Manila